The 1997 CAF Champions League was the 33rd season of Africa's premier club football tournament organized by CAF, and the inaugural season under the revamped CAF Champions League title and format. Raja Casablanca of Morocco defeated Obuasi Goldfields of Ghana on penalties in the final to win their second title.

Qualifying rounds

Preliminary round

|}
1 AS Tempête Mocaf were disqualified for not paying the entry fee. 
2 Blue Waters FC withdrew.

First round

|}

Second round

|}

Group stage

Group A

Group B

Knockout stage

Final

Top goalscorers

The top scorers from the 1997 CAF Champions League are as follows:

External links
1997 African Club Competitions at RSSSF

1997 CAF Champions League
1997 in African football
CAF Champions League seasons